Bahía de Cádiz Natural Park (Parque Natural de la Bahía de Cádiz) is a  natural park located in the province of Cádiz (Andalusia, Spain). It was established in 1989.

Nature 

Located at the mouth of the Guadalete river, it consists of marshland, beaches, reed and sand dunes. It has many types of shrubs and bushes, and ocean pine.

Recreational activities include bird watching, sailing, windsurfing and hiking.

It has been designated a Site of Community Importance.
Animals that can be found include solan goose, stork, cormorant, great crested grebe, seagull, flamingo, tern, sea eagle and avocet. The park is a Special Protection Area (Zona de Especial Protección para las Aves, ZEPA)

Gallery

References

External links 

 Official site at Junta de Andalucía
  at This is Andalucia

Natural parks of Spain
Natural parks of Andalusia
Geography of the Province of Cádiz
Special Protection Areas of Spain
Ramsar sites in Spain